Lucien-L'Allier station may refer to:

Lucien-L'Allier station (RTM)
Lucien-L'Allier station (Montreal Metro)

See also
Lucien L'Allier